Semih Yağcı (born November 11, 1988) is a Turkish  weightlifter competing in the –77 kg division.

He won the gold medal at the 2011 European Weightlifting Championships held in Kazan, Russia lifting for bronze medal in the Snatch category and then for the gold medal 
in the Clean&Jerk discipline.

Medals

European Championships

Mediterranean Games

European Under 23 Championships

References

External links
International Weightlifting Federation

1988 births
Living people
Turkish male weightlifters
European champions in weightlifting
European champions for Turkey
Mediterranean Games silver medalists for Turkey
Mediterranean Games bronze medalists for Turkey
Competitors at the 2009 Mediterranean Games
Competitors at the 2013 Mediterranean Games
Mediterranean Games medalists in weightlifting
European Weightlifting Championships medalists
20th-century Turkish people
21st-century Turkish people